Jonathan Deininger Sauer (July 16, 1918 Ann Arbor, Michigan – May 25, 2008, Pacific Palisades, Los Angeles) was a botanist and plant geographer.

Jonathan D. Sauer, whose father was Carl O. Sauer, graduated in 1939 from the University of California, Berkeley with a B.A. in history. He then entered the graduate program in geography at the University of Wisconsin–Madison. His academic career was interrupted by WW II when he was drafted into the U.S. Army Air Forces. He was stationed at the Pentagon, where he worked as a weather specialist. He married in 1946 and became a graduate student in botany, studying under Edgar Anderson at Washington University in St. Louis. Sauer graduated there in 1950 with a Ph.D. dissertation on the grain amaranths. In 1950 he returned to the University of Wisconsin–Madison as an instructor in the botany department. His research dealt with "plant taxonomy, plant geography, economic botany and plant evolution." In 1959 he became a professor at U. W. Madison with a joint appointment in the departments of botany and geography. In 1971 Sauer became a professor in the geography department of the University of California, Los Angeles (UCLA), where he retired as professor emeritus. 

In 1946 he married Hilda Sievers (1922–2019), whom he met when they both worked at the Pentagon. They had a son, Richard (b. 1951).

Selected publications

Articles

 (See Phytolacca.)

 (See Hohokam.)
 (See Stenotaphrum.)

Books

References

1918 births
2008 deaths
American geographers
20th-century geographers
21st-century geographers
20th-century American botanists
21st-century American botanists
University of California, Berkeley alumni
Washington University in St. Louis alumni
University of Wisconsin–Madison faculty
University of California, Los Angeles faculty
University of Wisconsin–Madison alumni
United States Army Air Forces personnel of World War II